HeroQuest, sometimes written as Hero Quest, is an adventure board game created by Milton Bradley in conjunction with the British company Games Workshop. The game was loosely based around archetypes of fantasy role-playing games: the game itself was actually a game system, allowing the gamemaster (called "Morcar" and "Zargon" in the United Kingdom and North America respectively) to create dungeons of their own design using the provided game board, tiles, furnishings and figures. The game manual describes Morcar/Zargon as a former apprentice of Mentor, and the parchment text is read aloud from Mentor's perspective. Several expansions were released, each adding new tiles, traps, artifacts, and monsters to the core system.

A crowdfunded remake of the board game was released in 2021.

History

In the late 1980s, game designer Stephen Baker moved from Games Workshop (GW) to Milton Bradley, and convinced Roger Ford, Milton Bradley's head of development to allow him to develop a fantasy genre game. Kennedy gave him the go-ahead if he kept the game simple. Basker contacted his former employer, Games Workshop, to develop the plastic miniatures that would be needed in the game, but he then decided to draw on their expertise in the fantasy game field to help develop the game. The result was the fantasy adventure board game HeroQuest (1989), in which the players work together against the gamemaster. The game was released in Britain, Europe and Australia in 1989, and the North American edition, with a different subtitle - Game system, in 1990.

The game consists of a board and a number of individual miniatures and items. The protagonists are four heroes ("Barbarian", "Dwarf", "Elf" and "Wizard") who face a selection of monsters: Orcs, Goblins, Fimir, Chaos Warriors, a Chaos Warlock (which represents many of the named characters for the various quests, such as Sir Ragnar and the Witch Lord), a Gargoyle and a number of Undead: skeletons, zombies and mummies.

In a 1989 interview, designer Stephen Baker agreed that the game was too easy if the players all cooperated, but explained that "The game is really aimed at 10–12 year olds who play with their mums and dads. My feeling is that they play in a very competitive, rather co-operative way."

The publication of expansion sets was then split between the European and Australasian markets and the North American markets. Starting with Kellar's Keep, released in Europe and Australasia in 1989, and North America in 1991. Kellar's Keep added new quests, new items and artifacts and a further batch of monster figures (more Orcs, Goblins and Fimir). Released shortly after in the same years was Return of the Witch Lord which extended the undead with more skeletons, mummies and zombies.

Advanced HeroQuest was a revised and expanded version of the HeroQuest game released in 1989 by Games Workshop. The basic concept is the same: four heroes venture into a dungeon to fight monsters and gain treasure, but the rules are more detailed and complex.

Against the Ogre Horde was released in 1990 in Europe and Australasia, and included Ogres, a more powerful monster type, while Wizards of Morcar was released in 1991, themed around the addition of enemy wizards.

A HeroQuest Adventure Design Kit was released in Europe in 1990, containing items to help HeroQuest players design their own quests, and an Adventure Design Booklet was published with four sheets of adhesive labels and with an 80-page pad of a new design, larger character sheet. There was also a blank quest map printed in the middle of the original game's quest booklet for creative players to make their own adventures.

1991 saw the first computer adaption released. The HeroQuest computer game, forcing Sierra On-Line to rename their Hero's Quest series to Quest for Glory. A version of the game for the NES was developed to a prototype stage, simply named HeroQuest, but was never released. A sequel for the Amiga titled HeroQuest II: Legacy of Sorasil was released in 1994.

1992 saw the release of HeroQuest Advanced Quest Edition (also known by the German version name "HeroQuest Master Edition") was released later with 12 added miniatures ("black guards") with 4 kinds of detachable weapons and a new 13 part adventure "The Dark Company" in addition to the original contents of the basic HeroQuest box.

1992 also saw North America release of two sets of their own: The Frozen Horror, with a snow and ice theme, featured a Female Barbarian, Mercenaries, Ice Gremlins, Polar Warbears and a pair of yeti as well as the "Frozen horror" of the title, while The Mage of the Mirror had an Elven theme: Female Elf against an evil Elven Archmage, Elf warriors and archers, Giant Wolves and Ogres.

Three HeroQuest novels by Dave Morris were published: The Fellowship of the Four, The Screaming Spectre and The Tyrant's Tomb. 

In 1997, Milton Bradley let their HeroQuest trademark lapse. It was subsequently purchased by Issaries, Inc. who used it for an unrelated tabletop role-playing game. This was sold in 2013 to Moon Design Publications who continued to use it for the same purpose, eventually selling it back to Milton Bradley (now Hasbro Gaming) in 2020.

HeroQuest remake
At the direction of Jeffrey Anderson, the general manager of Hasbro Gaming, the company bought the HeroQuest trademark from Chaosium in September 2020. This allowed Avalon Hill, a subsidiary of Hasbro, to launch a teaser website with the HeroQuest logo, art and a countdown timer, leading to speculation that an official remake or app was being produced. On September 22, 2020, the countdown revealed a Hasbro Pulse crowdfunded campaign for $1,000,000 to produce a updated edition of HeroQuest with new figures, and Kellar's Keep and Return of the Witch Lord expansions. Funding was achieved with 24 hours, with Hasbro expecting to ship in late 2021. The initial campaign was for US & Canada only, with Hasbro later expanding the campaign to include Australia, United Kingdom and New Zealand. Games Workshop branding and intellectual property was removed, with all art replaced; the "Chaos" monicker changed to "Dread" in all instances; miniatures all received new sculpts; and the Fimir monsters, a type of water-based lizard monster originating in the Warhammer universe, replaced by the fish-based Abomination monsters.

In 2021, HeroQuest was re-released in retail stores, along with two expansions, Kellar's Keep and Return of the Witch Lord.

In August 2022, the Barbarian Quest Pack expansion was re-released as The Frozen Horror Quest Pack.

Avalon Hill have announced they expect to re-release the Elf Quest Pack, called The Mage of the Mirror, in Spring 2023.

The Mage of the Mirror Quest Pack was re-released in March of 2023.

Components 
The original boxed game comes with the following components:

 16-page rule book
 36-page quest book
 game board
 gamemaster's screen
 15 pieces of furniture 
 21 doors
 door and trap tiles
 64 playing cards
 dice
 4 character references
 pad of character sheets
 35 plastic miniatures

Characters
The heroes are agents of the Wizard known only as Mentor, Zargon's former master and keeper of a book called Loretome, which contains all the world's knowledge. The four player characters offer a choice of gameplay. The Barbarian and Dwarf allow a more combat-oriented game, while the Wizard and Elf can cast spells. The artwork and miniatures of each character are standardised, but the equipment stats vary somewhat from this basic portrait.

 Barbarian The barbarian figurine is depicted as being tall and muscular, brandishing a broadsword. He is the strongest character in combat, benefiting from excellent attack and health, but lacks any magical abilities and is fairly weak against magical attacks. His starting weapon is a broadsword.
 Dwarf The dwarf figurine is short, stocky and well armored, carrying a battle axe. He is very good in health, but lacks the attack strength of the barbarian and the magical prowess of the elf or wizard. However, the dwarf can boast the unique ability of being able to disarm traps without the aid of a toolkit. His starting weapon is a short sword.
 Elf The elf figurine is tall and slender, armed with a short one-handed sword. He is equal in attack strength to the dwarf, but is less physically robust. He is able to use one type of spell element (air, earth, fire, or water magic) and can resist magical attacks more effectively. His starting weapon is a short sword. In the 2021 re-release, the elf is female by default rather than male.
 Wizard The wizard figurine wears a full-length cloak and carries a staff. In combat, he is the weakest in attack and health and is unable to use most weapons and armor, but compensates for this by being able to use three types of spell elements, for a total of nine spells. His greater mind allows him to be the hero most resistant to the effects of magic. His starting weapon is a dagger.

Gameplay
The game is played on a grid representing the interior of a dungeon or castle, with walls segmenting the grid into rooms and corridors. One player assumes the role of the evil wizard character (Zargon/Morcar), and uses a map taken from the game's quest book to determine how the quest is to be played. The map details the placement of monsters, artifacts, and doors, as well as the overall quest the other players are embarking upon. Quests vary and include scenarios such as escaping a dungeon, killing a particular character, or obtaining an artifact. The evil wizard first places the entry point on the map, usually a spiral staircase, although on some quests the players enter via an external door or begin in a specific room. The map may also specify a wandering monster. This is a monster that may enter the game if a player is unlucky while searching for treasure.

The remaining players select their character from the four available. If the wizard is chosen while the Elf is not then the wizard player may choose any three spell sets. If the Elf is chosen while the wizard is not then the Elf may choose any spell set. If both the wizard and Elf are chosen then the wizard chooses a spell set first, then the Elf chooses a set and the wizard gets the remaining two sets. The players may also start the quest with items collected on previous quests, such as extra weapons, armor, and magic items.

The game begins with the gamemaster reading the quest story from the perspective of Mentor, to set the scene for the game about to be played. Starting with the player to the left of the evil wizard, the game begins.

During a Hero's turn, the player can move before or after performing one of the following actions: attack, cast a spell, search for traps and secret doors, search for treasure.

Movement
Players roll two six-sided dice, referred to as "Red Dice" in the game manual, and may then move up to that number of squares. A player does not need to move the full amount of the roll and can end movement at any time. Players may move over a square occupied by another player if the occupying player grants permission, but may not occupy the same square. Doors, monsters, and other objects are placed on the board by the evil wizard player according to line of sight. Once placed on the board they are not removed unless killed, thereby providing a steady stream of monsters for the evil wizard player to use.

Combat
Combat involves special six-sided dice, referred to as "White Combat Dice" in the manual, each bearing 3 "skull" sides, 2 "Hero" shield sides and 1 "monster/Zargon" shield side. The character players and the evil wizard player use the same dice, but the evil wizard player has a smaller chance of rolling their specific shield. The number of dice used is determined by the basic statistics of the player or monster, whether they are attacking or defending, plus any modifiers due to spells or items being carried.

The attacker attempts to roll as many skulls as possible, and the defender as many shields as possible. If the attacker rolls more skulls than the defender rolls shields, the defender loses body points according to how many skulls they failed to defend. If a character's body point count falls to zero, they are killed and must be removed from the game. If there is a fellow hero in the same room or hall when the hero died, that hero may then pick up all weapons, armor, gold and any artifacts. At the start of the next quest a new hero can be created and then given all items. If the hero dies with no other hero in the same room or hall then the monster collects all items and all are then lost forever.

Spell casting
The Wizard and the Elf are the only two player characters allowed to use spells, and must choose their spells from four sets of element-themed (Air, Fire, Water, Earth) spell cards, each consisting of three spells. A further set of 12 "Chaos Spells" is available to Zargon, but the use of those spells is restricted to special monsters. Spells can be broadly split into offensive, defensive, and passive varieties, and their use and effect vary greatly. Some spells must be played immediately before attacking or defending, and all require the target to be "visible" to the character using the game's line-of-sight rules. Each spell may only be cast once per quest in the base game.

Searching for traps and secret doors
There are four kinds of traps in HeroQuest: pit traps, spear traps, chest traps, and occasionally falling rocks. Of these, only spear traps and chest traps do not appear on the board as they are activated only once and then they have no lingering effects. If a pit trap is not discovered and a player walks over it, they fall in and lose one body point. The pit will remain in play as a square that may be jumped over. A falling rock trap will cause a rock slide tile to remain in play as a square that must now be navigated around, much like a wall. A quest may also contain secret doors which allow alternative routes to the objective or access to secret rooms containing treasure or monsters.

A player can only search for traps and secret doors in the room or corridor they are currently standing, and only if there are no monsters within the room or corridor. When this happens, the evil wizard character indicates where any traps may be and places secret door objects on the map. Trap tiles are only placed onto the board once a hero trips the trap. It is important for players to remember where traps are once they have been revealed.

The dwarf is the only character that can disarm traps without the aid of the specialized kit which is either bought in the armory or found during certain quests.

Searching for treasure
In a similar manner, players can search a room for treasure if no monsters are in the room. On some quests, searching for treasure in certain rooms will yield a particularly valuable artifact. More likely, however, the quest will not have specified any treasure for the current location and instead a treasure card is taken. Out of the 25 Treasure Cards, 6 are Wandering Monster cards and 4 are Hazard Cards, making a total of 10 "bad" cards that get put back in the deck when discovered. There is also a chance that searching for treasure may trigger chest traps that were not disarmed, or cause monsters to attack, usually a Gargoyle already in the room that does not move at first and cannot be harmed until it does move or attacks a Hero.

Game end
The game ends when every player has either returned to the spiral staircase, exited by a door or been killed by the evil wizard. If the objective of the quest has not been accomplished then the evil wizard character wins. Items collected during the quest may be kept for future quests. The quests usually form part of a longer story, especially the quests which are part of the expansion packs.

Expansions

HeroQuest "Kellar's Keep"
HeroQuest "Return of the Witch Lord"
HeroQuest "Adventure Design Kit" (Europe)
HeroQuest "Against the Ogre Horde" (Europe)
HeroQuest "Wizards of Morcar" (Europe)
HeroQuest "The Frozen Horror" / "Barbarian Quest Pack" (North America)

This expansion featured a female barbarian blue hero miniature.
HeroQuest "The Mage of the Mirror" / "Elf Quest Pack" (North America)

This expansion featured a female elf blue hero miniature. Its name was changed to "Quest Pack for the Elf" in a settlement after Warp Graphics, owner of the ElfQuest trademark, brought suit against Milton Bradley for infringement.

Reception
In the August 1989 edition of Games International (Issue 8), Philip A. Murphy thought that HeroQuest "plays simply but effectively" but he noted a few flaws, mainly to do with loopholes in the rules that players can quickly take advantage of. He concluded by giving it an average rating of 3.5 out of 5 stars, saying, "HeroQuest is a good game waiting to be a great one."

In the April 1991 edition of Dragon (Issue #168), Ken Rolston was enthusiastic about this game, commenting that it "scores early and often in toy value and accessibility for young gamers [...] a simple fantasy board game that ingeniously incorporates the [fantasy role-playing game] convention of the gamemaster/referee who confronts a cooperative party of adventurers with deadly traps, monsters, and arch-villains." He did admit that the adventures were pre-programmed, noting that "this game provides none of the broad creative and improvisational impulses that the D&D game provides." He also noted that this was a game for children, saying, "I can’t see myself playing the HeroQuest game with other adults, particularly with FRPG or board-game veterans, unless everyone’s tongue is firmly planted in cheek."

Reviews
Dragão Brasil #3 (1994) (Portuguese)
Jeux & Stratégie nouvelle formule #7

Awards
At the 1992 Origins Awards, HeroQuest won for "Best Graphic Presentation of a Boardgame 1991".

See also
 Dungeon crawl
 Warhammer Quest
 Descent: Journeys in the Dark
 Dungeons & Dragons: The Fantasy Adventure Board Game
 Space Crusade

References

External links
 
Heroquest at Hasbro Pulse

Dungeon crawler board games
Board games introduced in 1989
Board games with a modular board
British board games
Cooperative board games
Fantasy board games
Games Workshop games
Milton Bradley Company games
Origins Award winners
Turn-based strategy video games
Warhammer Fantasy